Igor Henrique Martins Machado (born 20 December 1991) is a Brazilian footballer who plays for Ituano as a midfielder.

Club career
Born in Castanhal, Pará, Henrique started his career with lower tier Esporte Clube XV de Novembro (Jaú) and subsequently played for Esporte Clube Iranduba da Amazônia and Barretos Esporte Clube. While playing with Barretos, he emerged as the top-scorer of the Paulista A3 after having scored 11 goals. On 6 March 2015, he moved to Mirassol Futebol Clube after agreeing to a two-year deal.

In 2016, Henrique moved to Ituano Futebol Clube. The following year, he moved to Tombense Futebol Clube. On 4 April 2017, Série A club Atlético Goianiense announced that he would join their club on a one year loan deal from Ituano at the end of the Paulista championship. On 16 July, he scored his first goal in a 2–1 defeat against Atlético Mineiro. He contributed with one goal in 28 matches; expressing his desire to renew his contract for the next season.

On 22 December 2017, Henrique moved to Fortaleza Esporte Clube on a year-long loan deal. On 20 December 2018, Ponte Preta announced the signing of Henrique.

References

1991 births
Living people
Brazilian footballers
Campeonato Brasileiro Série A players
Association football midfielders
Atlético Clube Goianiense players
Barretos Esporte Clube players
Ituano FC players
Mirassol Futebol Clube players
Fortaleza Esporte Clube players
Associação Atlética Ponte Preta players
Sportspeople from Pará
People from Castanhal